Ligovka-Yamskaya Municipal Okrug is a municipal okrug in Tsentralny District, one of the eighty-one low-level municipal divisions  of the federal city of St. Petersburg, Russia. As of the 2010 Census, its population was 16,825, up from 14,740 recorded during the 2002 Census.

Geography
The municipal okrug borders Nevsky Avenue in the north, the Neva River in the east, Obvodny Canal in the south, and Ligovsky Avenue in the west.

Architecture
Places of interest include the Moskovsky railway terminal and Alexander Nevsky Lavra.

References

Notes

Sources

Tsentralny District, Saint Petersburg